State Artist (also sometimes translated as "National Artist") is an honorary title granted to prominent artists by the government of Turkey for their contributions to the Turkish culture. It was established in 1971 by the President of Turkey (Cevdet Sunay) and the Minister of Culture and Tourism.

The award is issued for people occupied in various categories of arts: music, dance, theatre, photography, cinema, visual arts, literature, etc.

List of State Artists
By year, according to the list by the Ministry of Culture and Tourism of Turkey.

1971 
 Adnan Saygun, composer
 Necil Kazım Akses, composer
 Ulvi Cemal Erkin, composer
 Mithat Fenmen, composer
 İlhan Usmanbaş, composer
 Gülay Uğurata, pianist
 İdil Biret, pianist
 Suna Kan, violinist
 Ayla Erduran, violinist
 Ayşegül Sarıca, pianist
 Verda Erman, pianist

1981 
 Nevid Kodallı, composer
 Cemal Reşit Rey, composer
 Hikmet Şimşek, conductor
 Gürer Aykal, conductor
 İsmail Aşan, violinist
 Tunç Ünver, violinist
 Cüneyt Gökçer, actor
 Yıldız Kenter, actress
 Meriç Sümen, ballet dancer
 Suna Korad, opera singer

1987 
Nevzat Atlığ, choir conductor
 Ayhan Baran, opera singer
 Vasfi Rıza Zobu, actor
 Bedia Muvahhit, actress
 Mükerrem Berk, flutist
 Gülsin Onay, pianist
 Ayten Gökçer, actress

1988 
 Aydın Gün, opera singer
 Leyla Gencer, opera singer

1991 
 Necdet Yaşar, classical Turkish musician
 İsmail Baha Sürelsan, classical Turkish musician
 Alaattin Yavaşça, classical Turkish musician
 Zeki Müren, classical Turkish musician
 Teoman Önaldı, classical Turkish musician
 Yesari Asım Arsoy, classical Turkish musician
 Sadi Yaver Ataman, Turkish folk musician
 Nida Tüfekçi, Turkish folk musician
 Mustafa Geceyatmaz, Turkish folk musician
 Mustafa Turan, folk dances
 Barış Manço, pop music
 Hüseyin Sermet, pianist
 Güher Pekinel, pianist
 Süher Pekinel, pianist
 Okan Demiriş, opera singer
 Mete Uğur, opera singer
 Macide Tanır, actress
 Bozkurt Kuruç, actor
 Osman F. Seden, film director
 Türkan Şoray, film actress
 Hülya Koçyiğit, film actress
 Orhan Şaik Gökyay, poet
 Tarık Buğra, writer
 Attila İlhan, writer
 Ali Avni Çelebi, painter
  Sabri Berkel, painter
 Turan Erol, painter
Devrim Erbil, painter
 Hüseyin Arıkan Özkan, sculptor
 Sadi Diren, ceramic art

1998 
 Müzeyyen Senar
 Mehveş Emeç
 Şefika Kutluer
 Tekin Akmansoy
 Muazzez Abacı
 Metin Akpınar
 İzzet Altınmeşe
 Selmi Andak
 Avni Anıl
 Nezihe Araz
 Muzaffer Arıkan
 Orhan Asena
 Semih Balcıoğlu
 Recep Bilginer
 Ali Can
 Koral Çalgan
 İnci Çayırlı
 Merih Çimenciler
 Ali Doğan
 Haldun Dormen
 Armağan Elçi
 Erol Erdinç
 Özdemir Erdoğan
 Musa Eroğlu
 Muazzez Ersoy
 Semiha Berksoy
 Zeki Alasya
 Mengü Ertel
 Orhan Gencebay
 Nurşen Girginkoç
 Rengim Gökmen
 Ruşen Güneş
 Fahrettin Güven
 Nedret Güvenç
 Fikret Hakan
 Selahattin İçli
 Selim İleri
 Çolpan İlhan
 Yekta Kara
 Cemil Karababa
 Müşfik Kenter
 Kayıhan Keskinok
 Levent Kırca
 Atilla Manizade
 Yusuf Nalkesen
 Tankut Öktem
 Gazanfer Özcan
 Ahmet Özhan
 Münir Özkul
 Sezen Cumhur Önal
 Kutlu Payaslı
 Ajda Pekkan
 Ali Poyrazoğlu
 Ozan Sağdıç
 Mustafa Sağyaşar
 Samime Sanay
 Emel Sayın
 Timur Selçuk
 Nedret Selçuker
 Nesrin Sipahi
 Ferit Sidal
 Kamil Sönmez
 Muammer Sun
 Gülriz Sururi
 Dinçer Sümer
 Şener Şen
 Ziya Taşkent
 Orhan Taylan
 Okay Temiz
 Zekai Tunca
 Neriman Altındağ Tüfekçi
 Dilek Türker
 Nejat Uygur
 Necdet Varol
 Gönül Yazar
 Jale Yılmabaşar
 Nilüfer Yumlu
 Metin Yurdanur
 Gülşen Tatu

See also
National Artist, People's Artist, similar awards in other states

References 

Turkey
 
1971 establishments in Turkey
Lists of celebrities
Honorary titles of Turkey